Milton Rosmer (4 November 1881 – 7 December 1971) was a British actor, film director and screenwriter. He made his screen debut in The Mystery of a Hansom Cab (1915) and continued to act in theatre, film and television until 1956. In 1926 he directed his first film The Woman Juror and went on to direct another 16 films between 1926 and 1938.

He began his acting career as a stage actor and appeared as Francis Tresham in "The Breed of the Treshams" (1903) opposite John Martin-Harvey.

Milton Rosmer died in Chesham, Buckinghamshire in 1971.

Partial filmography

Actor

 The Mystery of a Hansom Cab (1915) - Mark Frettleby
 Whoso Is Without Sin (1916) - The Vicar
 Still Waters Run Deep (1916) - John Mildmay
 Cynthia in the Wilderness (1916) - Harvey Elwes
 The Man Without a Soul (1916) - Stephen Ferrier
 Lady Windermere's Fan (1916) - Lord Windermere
 The Greater Need (1916) - Bob Leroy
 Little Women (1917) - Theodore Lawrence
 The Chinese Puzzle (1919) - Sir Roger de la Haye
 The Odds Against Her (1919) - Leo Strathmore
 With All Her Heart (1920) - Geoffrey Bell
 Wuthering Heights (1920) - Heathcliff
 Colonel Newcome (1920) - B. Newcombe
 The Twelve Pound Look (1920) - Harry Sims
 The Golden Web (1920) - Sterling Deans
 Torn Sails (1920) - Hugh Morgan
 Demos (1921) - Richard Mortimer
 The Will (1921) - Philip Ross
 The Diamond Necklace (1921) - Charles Furness
 Belphegor the Mountebank (1921) - Belphegor
 The Amazing Partnership (1921) - Pryde
 A Woman of No Importance (1921) - Lord Illingworth
 General John Regan (1921) - Dr. O'Grady
 A Romance of Wastdale (1921) - David Gordon
 The Passionate Friends (1922) - Steven Stratton
 David Garrick (1922, Short) - David Garrick
 The Pointing Finger (1922) - Lord Rollestone / Earl Edensore
 Tense Moments with Great Authors (1922) - David Garrick (segment "David Garrick")
 La donna e l'uomo (1923)
 A Gamble with Hearts (1923) - Dallas Chalfont
 Shadow of Egypt (1924) - Harold Westcott
 High Treason (1929) - Ernest Stratton (uncredited)
 The W Plan (1930) - President of Court Martial
 Grand Prix (1934)
 The Phantom Light (1935) - Dr. Carey
 South Riding (1938) - Alderman Snaith
 Let's Be Famous (1939) - Albert Pinbright
 Goodbye, Mr. Chips (1939) - Chatteris
 The Lion Has Wings (1939) - Head of Observer Corps
 The Stars Look Down (1940) - Harry Nugent, MP
 Return to Yesterday (1940) - Sambourne
 Atlantic Ferry (1941) - George Burns
 Frieda (1947) - Merrick
 Fame Is the Spur (1947) - Magistrate
 The End of the River (1947) - The Judge
 Who Killed Van Loon? (1948) - Simmonds
 Daybreak (1948) - Governor
 The Monkey's Paw (1948) - Mr. Trelawne
 The Small Back Room (1949) - Prof. Mair
 John Wesley (1954) - Trustee of Georgia

Screenwriter
 Balaclava (1928)

Director
 The Perfect Lady (1931)
 P.C. Josser (1931)
 Many Waters (1931)
 After the Ball (1932)
 Channel Crossing (1933)
 The Secret of the Loch (1934)
 What Happened to Harkness? (1934)
 Emil and the Detectives (1935)
 Everything Is Thunder (1936)
 The Great Barrier (1937)
 The Challenge (1938)

References

External links
 

1881 births
1971 deaths
English male stage actors
English male film actors
English male television actors
English male silent film actors
English male screenwriters
English film directors
People from Southport
20th-century English male actors
20th-century English screenwriters
20th-century English male writers